Donnie Bell (born March 3, 1963) is an American politician. He is a member of the Mississippi House of Representatives from the 21st District, being first elected in 2007. He is a member of the Republican party.

References

1963 births
Living people
Members of the Mississippi House of Representatives
Mississippi Democrats
Mississippi Republicans
Politicians from Tupelo, Mississippi
21st-century American politicians